What Happened to Jones is a 1926 American silent comedy film directed by William A. Seiter and starring Reginald Denny. It was produced and distributed by Universal Pictures. The film is based on the 1897 Broadway play What Happened to Jones by George Broadhurst.

Plot
As described in a review in a film magazine, Tom Jones (Denny), who is to be married the next day to Lucille Bigbee (Nixon), goes home but is inveigled into a poker game. The place is raided and Tom and a fat elderly friend, Ebenezer Goodly (Harlan), escaping down a fire escape land in a ladies' Turkish bath establishment, where they naturally create a hullabaloo and finally make a getaway in women's clothes, reaching Goodly's home in a milk wagon the next morning. When Tom dons the clothes of Goodly's brother, a bishop, who is expected that morning, he is seen by Mrs. Goodly (Fitzroy) and has to pose as the bishop. Complications follow thick and fast including the jealousy of a chap because Tom kisses his sweetheart, and the forcing of Tom as the bishop to officiate at the wedding of his fiancé to another chap. It all turns out right, for she recognizes Tom, says "I Don't" instead of "I Do." Tom escapes from the waiting cops by grabbing her and the real bishop (Elliott) and getting married in a speeding automobile.

Cast

Preservation
Prints of What Happened to Jones are preserved at the Cinematheque Royale de Belgique in Brussels, Filmmuseum in Amsterdam, and UCLA Film and Television Archives.

References

External links

Lobby poster

1926 films
1926 comedy films
American black-and-white films
Silent American comedy films
American films based on plays
American silent feature films
Cross-dressing in American films
Films directed by William A. Seiter
Surviving American silent films
Universal Pictures films
1920s American films